A Woman in the Rain is a 1992 Spanish comedy film directed by Gerardo Vera which stars Ángela Molina, Antonio Banderas, and Imanol Arias. It is a remake of the 1945 film Life on a Thread.

Plot 
Following the plight of glamorous woman Mercedes, caught in a rainstorm in Madrid, the plot bisects into two alternative tales in which Mercedes is picked up by different suitors: Basque socially-awkward businessman Ramón and handsome young artist Miguel.

Cast

Production 
An Atrium production, A Woman in the Rain is Gerardo Vera's directorial feature film debut. It is a remake of the script of Edgar Neville's 1945 film Life on a Thread (also adapted by Neville into a stage play in 1959).

Release 
Distributed by United International Pictures, the film was theatrically released in Spain on 28 February 1992.

See also 
 List of Spanish films of 1992

References

Bibliography 
 
 
 

Remakes of Spanish films
1992 comedy films
Spanish comedy films
1990s Spanish films
1990s Spanish-language films
Films directed by Gerardo Vera
Films set in Madrid
1992 directorial debut films